This list of tallest structures in Uzbekistan ranks skyscrapers, towers and other structures in Uzbekistan based on official height.

Completed tallest structures
This list ranks the tallest buildings and structures in Uzbekistan that stand at least  or 20 floors tall. Only completed structures and buildings that have been topped out are included.

See also
List of tallest structures in Central Asia
List of tallest structures in Turkmenistan
List of tallest structures in the former Soviet Union
List of tallest buildings in Asia

References 

Tallest structures in Uzbekistan, List of
Uzbekistan